Sober as a Judge is a 1958 comedy novel by the British writer Henry Cecil. It is the last in a trilogy that began with Brothers in Law.

Synopsis
Now a high court judge, Roger Thursby presides over a series of unusual cases.

References

Bibliography
 Jacob, Merle & Apple, Hope.  To be Continued: An Annotated Guide to Sequels. Greenwood Publishing Group, 2000.
 Reilly, John M. Twentieth Century Crime & Mystery Writers. Springer, 2015.

1958 British novels
Novels by Henry Cecil
Novels set in London
British comedy novels
Michael Joseph books